Snovskoye is a rural locality (a selo) in Novozybkovsky District, Bryansk Oblast, Russia. The population was 571 as of 2010. There are 5 streets.

Geography 
Snovskoye is located 13 km southeast of Novozybkov (the district's administrative centre) by road. Lakomaya Buda is the nearest rural locality.

References 

Rural localities in Novozybkovsky District